Prosymnus (Ancient Greek: Πρόσυμνος) (also known as Polymnus (Πόλυμνος) and Hypolipnus) was, in Greek mythology, a shepherd living near the reputedly bottomless Alcyonian Lake, hazardous to swimmers, which lay in the Argolid, on the coast of the Gulf of Argos, near the prehistoric site of Lerna.

When the wine god Dionysus went to Hades to rescue his mother Semele, Prosymnus guided him to the entrance by rowing him to the middle of the lake. The reward demanded by Prosymnus for this service was the right to make love to Dionysus. However, when Dionysus returned to earth by a different route, he found that Prosymnus had meanwhile died. Dionysus went to his tomb, wishing to keep his promise and "experiencing a desire to be penetrated". He carved a piece of fig wood into the shape of a phallus and inserted it into his anus. This, it is said, was given as an explanation of the presence of a fig-wood phallus among the secret objects revealed in the course of the Dionysian Mysteries.

This story is not told in full by any of the usual sources of Greek mythological tales, though several of them hint at it. It is reconstructed on the basis of statements by Christian authors; these have to be treated with reserve because their aim is to discredit pagan mythology.

Annual nocturnal rites took place at the Alcyonian Lake in classical times; Pausanias refuses to describe them.

References

Sources
 (US )

Dionysus in mythology
Consorts of Dionysus
LGBT themes in Greek mythology